The 1987 Copa del Rey Final was the 85th final of the Spanish cup competition, the Copa del Rey. The final was played at La Romareda in Zaragoza on 27 June 1987. The game was won by Real Sociedad 4–2 on penalties, after a 2–2 draw following extra time.

Details

References

1987
Copa
Real Sociedad matches
Atlético Madrid matches
Association football penalty shoot-outs